The 2016 Tennis Championships of Maui was a professional tennis tournament played on outdoor hard courts. It was the seventh (ATP) and first (ITF) editions of the tournament and part of the 2016 ATP Challenger Tour and the 2016 ITF Women's Circuit, offering a total of $50,000 in prize money for both genders. It took place in Lahaina, Maui, United States, on 25–31 January, 2016.

ATP singles main draw entrants

Seeds 

 1 Rankings as of 18 January 2016.

Other entrants 
The following players received wildcards into the singles main draw:
  Thibaud Berland
  Stefan Kozlov
  Jaume Martinez Vich
  Noah Rubin

The following player received entry as a lucky loser:
  Alex Bolt

The following players received entry from the qualifying draw:
  Ernesto Escobedo
  Nicolas Meister
  Michael Mmoh
  Eric Quigley

ITF singles main draw entrants

Seeds 

 1 Rankings as of 18 January 2016.

Other entrants 
The following players received wildcards into the singles main draw:
  Michaela Gordon
  Christina McHale
  Zhang Nannan

The following players received entry from the qualifying draw:
  Ashley Kratzer
  Evgeniya Levashova
  Magda Linette
  Risa Ushijima

Champions

Men's singles

 Wu Di def.  Kyle Edmund 4–6, 6–3, 6–4

Women's singles

 Christina McHale def.  Raveena Kingsley 6–3, 4–6, 6–4

Men's doubles

 Jason Jung /  Dennis Novikov def.  Alex Bolt /  Frank Moser 6–3, 4–6, [10–8]

Women's doubles

 Asia Muhammad /  Maria Sanchez def.  Jessica Pegula /  Taylor Townsend 6–2, 3–6, [10–6]

External links 
 2016 Tennis Champions of Maui at ITFtennis.com
 

2016 ITF Women's Circuit
2016 ATP Challenger Tour
Maui
Hard court tennis tournaments in the United States